Nigel John Biggar  (born 14 March 1955) is a British Anglican priest, theologian and ethicist. From 2007 to 2022, he was the Regius Professor of Moral and Pastoral Theology at the University of Oxford.

Early life
Biggar was born on 14 March 1955 in Castle Douglas, Scotland. He was educated at Monkton Combe School, a private school near Bath, Somerset. He studied modern history at Worcester College, Oxford, graduating with a Bachelor of Arts degree in 1976: as per tradition, his BA was promoted to a Master of Arts degree in 1988. He attended the University of Chicago, graduating with a Master of Arts degree in religious studies in 1980; and the evangelical Regent College, Vancouver, graduating with a Master of Christian Studies in 1981. He returned to the University of Chicago to study for his doctorate in Christian theology, and completed a Doctor of Philosophy degree in 1986.

Career
On his return to Oxford in 1985, Biggar became Librarian and Research Fellow at Latimer House. He additionally taught Christian ethics at Wycliffe Hall, Oxford from 1987 to 1994. He was ordained in the Church of England as a deacon in 1990 and as a priest in 1991. For most of the 1990s, he was Chaplain and Fellow of Oriel College, Oxford. In 1999, he took the Chair of Theology at the University of Leeds, and in 2004 he moved to the Chair of Theology and Ethics at Trinity College, Dublin. In 2007, he became Regius Professor of Moral and Pastoral Theology at the University of Oxford. He was additionally a canon of Christ Church Cathedral, Oxford. He retired in September 2022.

Biggar was appointed Commander of the Order of the British Empire (CBE) in the 2021 Birthday Honours for services to higher education.

Ethics and Empire project
In 2017, Biggar initiated a five-year project at Oxford University entitled "Ethics and Empire". Its stated aim was to scrutinise critiques against the historical facts of empire. Historians and academics widely criticised the project, claiming that it was 'attempting to balance out the violence committed in the name of empire with its supposed benefits.' The project also received criticism for failing to engage with the wider scholarship on empire and not submitting itself to peer scrutiny and rigorous academic debate. Biggar addressed the ethics of colonialism in an op-ed for The Times, arguing that the history of the British Empire was morally mixed and that guilt around Britain's colonial legacy may have gone too far. He also defended an article by Bruce Gilley, titled "The Case for Colonialism", asserting that Gilley's appeal for a balanced reappraisal of the colonial past was both courageous and a call for Britain to moderate its post-imperial guilt. 

His book, Colonialism. A Moral Reckoning, which examines the morality of colonialism, was initially accepted by Bloomsbury, but it chose not to publish to book with the suggestion that "public feeling on the subject does not currently support the publication of the book". It was eventually published by William Collins in 2023.  One review said that it was "littered with examples of what many of us would see as the most egregious misuse of sources."

Selected publications
 The Hastening that Waits: Karl Barth's Ethics (1993)
 Good Life: Reflections on What We Value Today (1997)
 Burying the Past: Making Peace and Doing Justice After Civil Conflict (2001)
 Aiming to Kill: The Ethics of Euthanasia and Assisted Suicide (2003)
 Behaving in Public: How to Do Christian Ethics (2011)
 In Defence of War (2013)
 Between Kin and Cosmopolis: An Ethic of the Nation (2014)
 What's Wrong with Rights? (2020)
  Religious Voices in Public Places (2009)
 Colonialism. A Moral Reckoning (2023)

References

External links
 Nigel Biggar Official Website
 "Anatomy of a Book Cancellation" by Nigel Biggar in Compact magazine

1955 births
20th-century Anglican theologians
20th-century Church of England clergy
20th-century English Anglican priests
20th-century English theologians
20th-century Scottish theologians
21st-century Anglican theologians
21st-century Church of England clergy
21st-century English Anglican priests
21st-century English theologians
21st-century Scottish theologians
Academics of the University of Leeds
Academics of Trinity College Dublin
Academics of the University of Oxford
People educated at Monkton Combe School
Alumni of Worcester College, Oxford
Canons (priests)
Church of England priests
English Anglican theologians
Fellows of Oriel College, Oxford
Living people
People associated with Christ Church, Oxford
Regent College alumni
Regius Professors of Moral and Pastoral Theology
Scottish Episcopal theologians
University of Chicago alumni
Historians of colonialism
Commanders of the Order of the British Empire